Winter Games is the eighth Japanese single (counted as seventh) by the South Korean boy band 2PM. It was released on October 16, 2013 in three different editions. The single also includes Stay Here as B-side track, which was supposed to be included in Masquerade. The limited Type B version comes with a bonus track, the Japanese version of Comeback When You Hear This Song from their 3rd Korean studio album Grown.

Track listing

Charts

Oricon

Release history

References

External links 
 Official Website
 Japanese Official Website

2013 singles
Dance-pop songs
Japanese-language songs
2PM songs
2013 songs
Epic Records singles